The Ragged Messenger is a 1917 British drama film directed by Frank Wilson and starring Violet Hopson, Gerald Ames, Basil Gill and George Foley. It was based on the 1904 novel The Ragged Messenger by W.B. Maxwell. A millionaire's mistress marries his nephew, but their relationship only leads to misery and heartbreak for all.

Cast
Violet Hopson as Mary Ainslee
Gerald Ames as Walter Bowman
Basil Gill as Reverend John Morton
George Foley as Henry Vavasour
Henry Gilbey		
Ruby Belasco		
John MacAndrews	
Marjorie West

References

External links
 

1917 films
1917 drama films
British silent films
British drama films
Films directed by Frank Wilson
British black-and-white films
1910s British films
Silent drama films